Rzucewo  is a village in the administrative district of Gmina Puck, within Puck County, Pomeranian Voivodeship, in northern Poland. There is also a castle called Rzucewo Castle, which was the residence of the former king of Poland.

For details of the history of the region, see History of Pomerania.

The village has a population of 354.

References

Rzucewo